Nicholas Mark Reding (born 31 August 1962 in Chiswick, London) is an English actor. During a career of more than two decades, he is probably best known for playing PC Pete Ramsey in The Bill and DI Michael Connor in the BBC crime thriller series Silent Witness. His many TV and film appearances include The Monocled Mutineer, Bodyguards, Oscar, Peak Practice, Frank Stubbs Promotes, Minder, Tales from the Crypt, Bugs, Sword of Honour, A Touch of Frost, Paradise Postponed, Murder in Mind, Boon, The Ruth Rendell Mysteries, Captive, Mister Johnson, The House of Eliott, Police 2020, Sunburn, Croupier, Judge John Deed, The Constant Gardener, Blood Diamond and Soul Boy. On stage he played Joseph Porter Pitt in Tony Kushner's Angels in America at the Royal National Theatre, as well as leading roles at the Royal Court. He also appeared in Lovejoy.

Charity work
Reding is founder and Executive Director of S.A.F.E. (Sponsored Arts for Education) a "Kenyan NGO and UK charity that uses street theatre and community programmes to educate, inspire and deliver social change" based in Africa, which creates arts projects in the developing world that help artists educate, entertain and challenge their communities about vital health issues such as HIV. S.A.F.E. runs three theatre companies in Kenya, Safe Pwani based in Mombasa, Safe Ghetto in Nairobi, and Safe Maa with the Maasai in the Loita Hills. The film Reding directed, Huruma, was recreated in Kibera slum as a stage performance in Fernando Meirelles's 2005 film The Constant Gardener. In 2007 Reding was given an award by Keep a Child Alive alongside Bono and Dr Pasquine Obasanyo for outstanding humanitarian work at the Black Ball in New York City. Reding currently lives in Nairobi, Kenya, running S.A.F.E. Reding has directed three feature films for S.A.F.E : Ndoto Za Elibidi, Ni Sisi and Watatu.

References

External links
 
 S.A.F.E., founded by Reding

1962 births
Living people
English male television actors
English male film actors
English humanitarians
Male actors from London
People from Chiswick
20th-century English male actors
21st-century English male actors